Quercus lungmaiensis is an uncommon Asian species of trees in the beech family Fagaceae. It has only been found in the Province of Yunnan in southwestern China. It is placed in subgenus Cerris, section Cyclobalanopsis.

Quercus lungmaiensis is a large tree up to 30 meters tall. Leaves can be as much as 11.5 cm long.

References

External links

lungmaiensis
Endemic flora of Yunnan
Trees of China
Plants described in 1951